Richard John Down (December 14, 1950 – January 5, 2019) was an American professional baseball hitting coach. He was the hitting coach for the New York Yankees, Boston Red Sox, Los Angeles Angels of Anaheim, Los Angeles Dodgers, New York Mets, and the Baltimore Orioles.

Early life 
Down never made the majors as a player, making it only to AAA ball (1971 and 1973). Down later went on to coach at the University of Nevada, Las Vegas from 1979 to 1984. He went to professional baseball in 1985–88 as a special assignment coach and roving hitting instructor for the Angels organization. He returned to the Yankees organization in 1989, beginning the season as the club’s roving minor league hitting instructor before being promoted to manager at Triple-A Columbus for the final 16 games of the season when Bucky Dent was named manager of the Yankees. In 1990, his Double-A Albany club was at a 24-21 mark when he was promoted to manage Columbus in June after Stump Merrill was named Yankees manager. In 1990–92, he guided Columbus to three consecutive International League Western Division Titles and two consecutive Governor’s Cup Crowns. His Clippers set a franchise record with 95 wins in 1992. Down’s Columbus team was in first place in 385 of 391 games while he was manager. He later became the hitting instructor for many major league clubs.

Career highlights

In 2002, the Yankees hit 223 home runs, second most in the American League and second highest single season total in franchise history.
The Yankees led the majors in batting average in each of his first two seasons as a hitting coach (1993–94). In 1994, the team's batting average of .290 was the highest Yankees' average since 1936 (.300) and the highest in the majors since Boston hit .302 in 1950.
He helped guide the 2000 Dodgers to a franchise record 211 home runs.
He led the 1996 Orioles to a then major league record 251 home runs in his first season with the club.
From 1990 to 1992, he served as the manager of the Yankees' Columbus (AAA) team of the International League. He led the 1992 club to a 95-49 record and a Governors' Cup Championship. The 95 victories were a franchise record and were the most wins in the IL since 1960, when Toronto went 100-54.
In three seasons at Columbus, he directed the Clippers to three straight International League West Division titles and two straight Governors' Cups. In three years, he won 242 games and had a winning percentage of .619.
He compiled a 122-273 record (.309 percentage) in six years as a minor league manager.
Spent seven seasons in the minors as an outfielder. Hit .257 with 33 home runs, 247 RBI and 54 stolen bases in 745 games. He was placed on Montreal's major league roster on September 30, 1971. 
Down also served as an advance scout for the San Francisco Giants and hitting coach for the Spokane Indians of the Northwest League.

Career timeline

2014: Spokane Indians (NW League Low A) hitting coach
2008: San Francisco Giants Advance Scout
2005-2007: New York Mets Hitting Coach
2004: New York Yankees Coordinator of Instruction
2002-2003: New York Yankees Hitting Coach
2001: Boston Red Sox Hitting Coach
1999-2000: Los Angeles Dodgers Hitting Coach
1996-1998: Baltimore Orioles Hitting Coach
1994-1995: New York Yankees Hitting Coach
1993: Venezuelan Winter League - Aragua Tigers Manager
1993: New York Yankees Hitting Coach
1992: Venezuelan Winter League - Aragua Tigers Manager
1992: Columbus Clippers (AAA) Manager
1991: Venezuelan Winter League - Aragua Tigers Manager
1990-1991: Columbus Clippers (AAA) Manager
1990: Albany Yankees (AA) Manager
1990: Venezuelan Winter League - Magallanes Sailors Manager
1989: Columbus Clippers (AAA) Manager
1989: New York Yankees Minor League Roving Hitting Instructor
1985-1988: California Angels Special Assignments Coach & Roving Hitting Instructor
1979-1984: University of Nevada-Las Vegas - Assistant Coach
1978: California League - Stockton (A) coach (?)
1977: Northwest League - Bellingham (A) coach (?)
????: Florida State League - West Palm Beach (A) coach {?)

References

External links

1950 births
2019 deaths
People from Wyandotte, Michigan
American expatriate baseball players in Canada
Baltimore Orioles coaches
Baseball players from Michigan
Boston Red Sox coaches
California Angels coaches
Los Angeles Dodgers coaches
Major League Baseball hitting coaches
Minor league baseball managers
New York Mets coaches
New York Yankees coaches
Gulf Coast Expos players
West Palm Beach Expos players
Winnipeg Whips players
Québec Carnavals players
Peninsula Whips players
Memphis Blues players
Stockton Mariners players
San Jose Missions players
Toronto Blue Jays scouts